The 2022 Washington Secretary of State special election was held on November 8, 2022. Incumbent Kim Wyman, a Republican, resigned from the office on November 19, 2021, to become the senior election security lead for the Cybersecurity and Infrastructure Security Agency in the Biden administration's Department of Homeland Security. Washington governor Jay Inslee, a Democrat, announced he would appoint state senator Steve Hobbs as her replacement, the first Democrat to hold the office in more than fifty years.

In the primary election, Hobbs easily took first place. The race for the second spot in the general election was a close three-way battle between state senator Keith Wagoner and technician Bob Hagglund, both Republicans, and Pierce County Auditor Julie Anderson, an Independent. After a week of tabulation, Anderson was declared the winner, with the three candidates separated by just over 14,000 votes—less than 1% of the total. Brad Klippert, a Republican state representative, ran a write-in campaign in the general election.

Hobbs narrowly won the general election with 49.8% of the vote, over 7% less than the vote share won by Patty Murray in the concurrent Senate race. This marked the first time since 1960 that a Democrat was elected Washington Secretary of State. Anderson did particularly well in Republican-leaning counties, although she did strongly in several historically Democratic ones nonetheless.

Primary election

Democratic Party

Declared 
Steve Hobbs, incumbent Washington Secretary of State
Marquez Tiggs

Republican Party

Declared 
Mark Miloscia, former state senator (2015–2019)
Keith Wagoner, state senator (2018–present)
Bob Hagglund, technician

Independents and third parties

Declared 
 Julie Anderson (Nonpartisan), Pierce County auditor
Kurtis Engle (Union)

Forum 
The League of Women Voters hosted a candidate forum on June 14. Five candidates were in attendance.

Endorsements

Polling

Results

General election

Predictions

Candidates 
Julie Anderson (Nonpartisan), Pierce County Auditor
Steve Hobbs (Democratic), incumbent Secretary of State
Brad Klippert (Republican, write-in), state representative, candidate for U.S. Senate in 2004 and 2006, and candidate for Washington's 4th congressional district in 2022

Debates 
A debate was held on August 17 by the Association of Washington Business. A second debate is scheduled for October 18 at the University of Puget Sound.

Endorsements 
Endorsements in bold were made after the primary election.

Polling

Results

By congressional district
Hobbs won 4 of 10 congressional districts with the remaining 6 going to Anderson, including four that elected Democrats.

Notes

Partisan clients

References

External links
Official campaign websites
Julie Anderson (NP) for Secretary of State
Steve Hobbs (D) for Secretary of State
Brad Klippet (R) for Secretary of State (write-in)

2022
Washington
November 2022 events in the United States
Secretary of State 2022
Secretary of State special